Musheibu Mohammed Alfa is a Ghanaian politician and the Deputy Minister of State for the Upper West Region of Ghana. Until June 2014, Alfa served as the Deputy Minister of Environment, Science and Innovation.

References

Ghanaian Ahmadis
Living people
National Democratic Congress (Ghana) politicians
Year of birth missing (living people)